Iqbal Khan Jadoon (1931 - 1977) was a Pakistani politician from the Khyber-Pakhtunkhwa province of Pakistan. He was born in 1931 in Abbottabad and died in 1977.  He was the 7th elected Chief Minister of the province from the 9 April 1977 to 5 July 1977.

See also 

 List of Chief Minister of Khyber Pakhtunkhwa
 Khyber Pakhtunkhwa

References

External links 
 Khyber-Pakhtunkhwa Provincial Government

Chief Ministers of Khyber Pakhtunkhwa
1931 births
Living people
People from Abbottabad
Pashtun people